Two ships of the Indonesian Navy have been called KRI Sultan Iskandar Muda, named after the Iskandar Muda of Acèh Darussalam, the twelfth Sultan of Aceh Sultanate, and a National Hero of Indonesia.

She was acquired in 1962 and stricken in 1971.
  is a  launched in 2007 and commissioned in 2008.

Indonesian Navy ship names